N-Sulfinylaniline is the organosulfur compound with the formula C6H5NSO. It is a straw-colored liquid. N-Sulfinylaniline is an example of a sulfinylamine. It is a dienophile and a ligand in organometallic chemistry.

Synthesis and structure
It is prepared by treating aniline with thionyl chloride:
3 PhNH2  +  SOCl2   →   PhNSO  +  2 [PhNH3]Cl

X-ray crystallographic analysis confirms that N-sulfinylaniline is structurally related to sulfur dioxide as well as sulfur diimide. The C–S=N=O dihedral angle is –1.60°,

References

Sulfur(IV) compounds
Phenyl compounds